Theodosius II (10 April 401 – 28 July 450) was Roman emperor for most of his life, proclaimed augustus as an infant in 402 and ruling as the eastern Empire's sole emperor after the death of his father Arcadius in 408. His reign was marked by the promulgation of the Theodosian law code and the construction of the Theodosian Walls of Constantinople. He also presided over the outbreak of two great Christological controversies, Nestorianism and Eutychianism.

Early life 

Theodosius was born on 10 April 401 as the only son of Emperor Arcadius and his wife Aelia Eudoxia. On 10 January 402, at the age of 9 months, he was proclaimed co-augustus by his father, thus becoming the youngest to bear the imperial title up to that point. On 1 May 408, his father died and the seven-year-old boy became emperor of the Eastern half of the Roman Empire.

Reign

Early reign 
The government was at first administered by the praetorian prefect Anthemius, under whose supervision the Theodosian Walls of Constantinople were constructed.

According to Theophanes the Confessor and Procopius, the Sasanian king Yazdegerd I (399–420) was appointed by Arcadius as the guardian of Theodosius, whom Yazdegerd treated as his own child, sending a tutor to raise him and warning that enmity toward him would be taken as enmity toward Persia. Though this story is assumed to be inconclusive, Antiochus, a eunuch of Persian origin, became a tutor and an influence on Theodosius. He also became praepositus sacri cubiculi later but Theodosius dismissed him when he reached his adulthood.

In 414, Theodosius' older sister Pulcheria vowed perpetual virginity along with her sisters. She was proclaimed augusta, and acted as a guardian of her brother. The guardianship ended when he reached his majority, but it is assumed that his sister continued to exert an influence on him until his marriage. In June 421, Theodosius married Aelia Eudocia, a woman of Athenian origin. The two had a daughter named Licinia Eudoxia, another named Flaccilla, and possibly a son called Arcadius.

In 423, the Western Emperor Honorius, Theodosius' uncle, died and the primicerius notariorum Joannes was proclaimed emperor. Honorius' sister Galla Placidia and her young son Valentinian, who had earlier fled to Constantinople to escape Honorius' hostility, sought Eastern assistance to claim the throne for Valentinian, and after some deliberation in 424 Theodosius opened the war against Joannes. On 23 October 425, Valentinian III was installed as emperor of the West with the assistance of the magister officiorum Helion, with his mother taking an influential role. To strengthen the ties between the two parts of the empire, Theodosius' daughter Licinia Eudoxia was betrothed to Valentinian. She married Valentinian III later on 29 October 437, and became empress of the western portion of the empire.

Theodosius is often seen by both ancient and modern historians as being constantly pushed around by his sister, wife, and eunuchs, particularly Chrysaphius among them. In the later decades of his life, Chrysaphius rose to prominence as one of the emperor's favorites. He favored the pro-Monophysite policy, influenced the foreign policy towards the Huns, and was resented by Pulcheria, general Zeno, and ancient writers. According to Theodorus Lector, Theodosius was so unmindful of his surroundings that he accidentally signed his sister's note selling his wife, Eudocia, into slavery.

However, some scholars argue that contrary to hostile ancient sources, Theodosius was more in control of his government. Others view that the government was controlled mostly by civilian officials, and not by a particular individual. Among ancient and medieval writers, Monophysites had a favorable opinion of Theodosius.

University and Law Code 
In 425, Theodosius founded the University of Constantinople with 31 chairs (15 in Latin and 16 in Greek). Among the subjects were law, philosophy, medicine, arithmetic, geometry, astronomy, music and rhetoric. It is likely that his wife Eudocia encouraged him in this matter and was behind the establishment of the university; she had been born in Athens, where the Neoplatonic School of Athens was the last great center for pagan, classical learning. Eudocia was known for her great intellect.

In 429, Theodosius appointed a commission to collect all of the laws since the reign of Constantine I, and create a fully formalized system of law. This plan was left unfinished, but the work of a second commission that met in Constantinople, assigned to collect all of the general legislations and bring them up to date, was completed; their collection was published as the Codex Theodosianus in 438. The law code of Theodosius II, summarizing edicts promulgated since Constantine, formed a basis for the law code of Emperor Justinian I, the Corpus Juris Civilis, in the following century.

Famous "apple incident"

Eudocia reached the height of her influence with the emperor from 439 to 441, a period in which the emperor's sister Pulcheria was sidelined in favor of his wife. Eudocia's power was undone by a certain Phrygian apple in a story conveyed by the sixth-century historian John Malalas of Antioch. Malalas wrote that one day, the emperor was on his way to church when a man presented the emperor with an "apple huge beyond any exaggeration." The emperor thanked the man with 150 solidi, and promptly sent the apple to his wife as a present. Eudocia decided to give the apple to Paulinus, a friend of both her and the emperor. Paulinus, unknowing of where Eudocia had gotten the apple, thought it was fit for only the emperor, and gave it to him. Theodosius was suspicious, and asked Eudocia what she had done with the apple. "I ate it," she replied, and then after Theodosius asked her to confirm her answer with an oath, which she did. Theodosius then presented her with the enormous apple. The emperor was enraged and suspected an affair between Eudocia and Paulinus; he had his lifelong friend Paulinus executed, and Eudocia asked to be exiled to Jerusalem. A separation ultimately occurred between the imperial couple around 443, with Eudocia's establishment in Jerusalem where she favored monastic Monophysitism.

Wars with the Huns, Vandals, and Persians
The situation between the Romans and the Sassanids deteriorated in 420 due to the Persian persecution of Christians, and the Eastern empire declared war against the Sassanids (421–422); the war ended in an indecisive stalemate, when the Romans were forced to accept peace as the Huns menaced Constantinople. Peace was arranged in 422 without changes to the status quo. The later wars of Theodosius were generally less successful.

The Eastern Empire was plagued by raids by the Huns. Early in Theodosius II's reign Romans used internal Hun discord to overcome Uldin's invasion of the Balkans. The Romans strengthened their fortifications and in 424 agreed to pay 350 pounds of gold to encourage the Huns to remain at peace with the Romans. In 433 with the rise of Attila and Bleda to unify the Huns, the payment was doubled to 700 pounds.

Theodosius became engaged with the affairs of the West after installing Valentinian III as his Western counterpart. When Roman Africa fell to the Vandals in 439, both Eastern and Western Emperors sent forces to Sicily, intending to launch an attack on the Vandals at Carthage, but this project failed. Seeing the borders without significant forces, the Huns and Sassanid Persia both attacked and the expeditionary force had to be recalled. During 443 two Roman armies were defeated and destroyed by the Huns. Anatolius negotiated a peace agreement; the Huns withdrew in exchange for humiliating concessions, including an annual tribute of 2,100 Roman pounds (c. 687 kg) of gold. In 447 the Huns went through the Balkans, destroying among others the city of Serdica (Sofia) and reaching Athyra (Büyükçekmece) on the outskirts of Constantinople. In 449, an Eastern Roman attempt to assassinate Attila failed, however the relations between the two did not deteriorate further.

Theological disputes

Theodosius frequently attempted to resolve doctrinal controversies regarding the nature of Christ. During a visit to Syria, Theodosius met the monk Nestorius, who was a renowned preacher. He appointed Nestorius archbishop of Constantinople in 428. Nestorius quickly became involved in the disputes of two theological factions, which differed in their Christology. Nestorius tried to find a middle ground between those who, emphasizing the fact that in Christ God had been born as a man, insisted on calling the Virgin Mary Theotokos ("birth-giver of God"), and those who rejected that title because God, as an eternal being, could not have been born. Nestorius suggested the title Christotokos ("birth-giver of Christ") as a compromise, but it did not find acceptance with either faction. He was accused of separating Christ's divine and human natures, resulting in "two Christs", a heresy later called Nestorianism. Though initially supported by the emperor, Nestorius was strongly opposed by Archbishop Cyril of Alexandria and eventually lost Theodosius' support. At the request of Nestorius, who sought to vindicate himself from Cyril's charge of heresy, the emperor called a council, which convened in Ephesus in 431. Each of the Cyrillian and Nestorian factions held their own councils in opposition to each other. Theodosius eventually favored Cyril. The council affirmed the title Theotokos and condemned Nestorius, who returned to his monastery in Syria and was eventually exiled to a remote monastery in Egypt.

Almost twenty years later, the theological dispute broke out again, this time caused by the Constantinopolitan abbot Eutyches, who asserted the Monophysite view that Christ's divine and human nature were one. Eutyches was condemned by Archbishop Flavian of Constantinople but found a powerful friend in Cyril's successor Dioscurus of Alexandria. Another council was convoked in Ephesus in 449, later maligned as a "robber synod" by Pope Leo I because its outcome was opposed by the Chalcedonians. This council restored Eutyches and deposed Flavian, who was mistreated and died shortly afterwards. Leo of Rome and many other bishops protested against the outcome, but the emperor supported it. Only after his death in 450 would the decisions be reversed at the Council of Chalcedon.

Death

Theodosius died on 28 July 450 as the result of a riding accident. On 25 November, his sister Pulcheria married the newly elected emperor Marcian, a domesticus under the influential general Aspar. The eunuch Chrysaphius was executed shortly after by the new imperial couple.

Like Constantine I and several of his successors, he was buried in the Church of the Holy Apostles, in a porphyry sarcophagus that was described in the 10th century by Constantine VII in the De Ceremoniis.

Saint Right-Believing Theodosius II the Younger is commemorated in Eastern Orthodox Church on 29 July.

See also

List of Byzantine emperors
Theodosian dynasty

References

Citations

Sources 

 Kelly, Christopher (2013). Theodosius II: Rethinking the Roman Empire in Late Antiquity. Cambridge: Cambridge University Press.
 Miller, Fergus (2006). A Greek Roman Empire: Power and Belief Under Theodosius II. Berkeley: University of California Press.
 Elton, Hugh (2009). "Imperial politics at the court of Theodosius II," in Andrew Cain (ed), The Power of Religion in Late Antiquity: The Power of Religion in Late Antiquity (Aldershot, Ashgate, 2009), 133–142.
 
 
 S. Crogiez-Pétrequin, P. Jaillette, J.-M. Poinsotte (eds.), Codex Theodosianus V. Texte latin d'après l'édition de Mommsen. Traduction, introduction et notes, Brepols Publishers, 2009, 
 Vasiliki Limberis, Divine Heiress: The Virgin Mary and the Creation of Christian Constantinople (London: Routledge, 1994) has a significant section about Theodosius II and his sister Pulcheria.
 
 
 "Theodosius II" in The Oxford Dictionary of Byzantium, Oxford University Press, New York & Oxford, 1991, p. 2051.

External links 

Reign of Theodosius II (chapter of J. B. Bury's History of the Later Roman Empire)
Theodosian Code: Sections concerning religious observances (English)
George Long, "Codex Theodosianus"
 Nathan, Geoffrey, "Theodosius II (408–450 A.D.)" (Archive). De Imperatoribus Romanis.
 This list of Roman laws of the fourth century shows laws passed by Theodosius II relating to Christianity.

 
Theodosian dynasty
Imperial Roman consuls
Deaths by horse-riding accident
401 births
450 deaths
Ancient child monarchs
Ancient legislators
5th-century Christians
5th-century Roman emperors
5th-century Byzantine emperors
5th-century Roman consuls
Sons of Byzantine emperors
Eastern Orthodox monarchs
Eastern Orthodox royal saints
Eastern Orthodox saints
Christian monarchs
Military saints
Christian royal saints
5th-century Christian saints